Fred Kelemen (born 1964, in Berlin) is a Hungarian-German film and theater director, cinematographer and writer.

The late Susan Sontag helped to promote Kelemen's work in the mid-1990s, comparing it to the likes of Alexander Sokurov, Béla Tarr and Sharunas Bartas.

Fred Kelemen studied painting, music, philosophy, science of religions and theater before attending the German Film & TV Academy in Berlin from 1989 to 1994. His debut film Fate in 1994 received the German National Film Award. He has also directed Frost (1997/98),  (1999) and Fallen (2005), each drawing international attention and numerous awards.

Kelemen has served as cinematographer for film directors including Béla Tarr (Journey to the Plain, 1995, The Man from London, 2007, The Turin Horse, 2011),  Rudolf Thome (2007), Gariné Torossian (Stone, Time, Touch, 2005), Joseph Pitchhadze (Sukaryot /Sweets], 2012/2013), Pavel Lungin (Esau, 2018) and others.

Since 2000 he has also directed several plays, including  an adaptation of Ray Bradbury’s Fahrenheit 451 at the Schauspielhaus in Hanover, and Eugene O'Neill's Desire Under The Elms at Volksbühne in Berlin. In addition, Kelemen has worked as a teacher at film and media institutes and universities at several locations.

With his production company Kino Kombat Filmmanufactur, Kelemen produced his film Krisana/Fallen (co-producer: Laima Freimane/Screen Vision, Latvia, 2005) and he produced or co-produced the films Moskatchka by Annett Schütze (co-producer: Laima Freimane/Screen Vision, Latvia, 2005), "Girlfriends" by Jana Marsik (co-producers: Laima Freimane/Screen Vision, Latvia, jana Marsik) and Fragment by Gyula Maár (producer: Béla Tarr/TTFilmműhely, Hungary, 2007).

Filmography
Director

 1993 – Kalyi
 1994 – Fate (Verhängnis)
 1997/1998 – Frost
 1999 – 
 2005 – Krisana
 2016 – Sarajevo Songs Of Woe
Cinematographer

 1993 – Kalyi
 1994 – Fate (Verhängnis)
 1995 – Utazás az Alföldön (short)
 1997/1998 – Frost
 1999 – 
 2000 – Tatau Samoa (documentary)
 2007 – Stone Time Touch (documentary)
 2007 – The Man from London
 2007 – 
 2011 – The Turin Horse
 2013 – Sukaryot
 2016 – Blue Psalm for Wolves / Sarajevo Songs of Woe 2018 - EsauAwards
 1994 – FIPRESCI-Award for "Fate" (original title: "Verhängnis")'
 1995 – German National Film Award (Silver Ribbon) for "Fate" (original title: "Verhängnis")
 1998 – FIPRESCI- Award for "Frost"
 1999 – FIPRESCI- Award for "Nightfall" (original title: "Abendland")
 2005 – FIPRESCI- Award for "Fallen" (original title: "Kisana")
 2005 – Latvian National Film Award "Best Cinematographer" for "Fallen" (original title: "Krisana")
 2005 – German Camera Award - Nomination 
 2011 – Golden Camera 300 - International Cinematographers' Film Festival Manaki Brothers / Macedonia for "The Turin Horse"
 2011 – Carlo Di Palma Best European Cinematographer Award - Nomination
 2012 – Hungarian National Film Award - Best Cinematographer
 2013 – Innovation Award of the German Film Critics' Association
 2016 – Special Prize MASTER, Yerevan International Film Festival "Golden Apricot" 
 2016 – St. Grigor Narekatsi Gold Medal of the Ministry of Culture of Armenia, Yerevan/Armenia

References

External links
 Koehler, Robert. "Interview | The Thinking Image: Fred Kelemen on Béla Tarr and The Turin Horse." Cinema Scope'' 46, accessed June 3, 2017.
 Fred Kelemen.com
 Karlovy Vary International Film Festival
 
 

1964 births
Film people from Berlin
Living people
German cinematographers